The history of the Chinese Communist Party began with its establishment in July 1921. A study group led by Peking University professors Chen Duxiu and Li Dazhao to discuss Marxism, led to intellectuals officially founding the Chinese Communist Party (CCP) in July 1921. In 1923, Sun Yat-sen invited the CCP to form a United Front, and to join his Nationalist Party (GMD) in Canton for training under representatives of the Comintern, the Soviet Union's international organization. The Soviet representatives reorganized both parties into Leninist parties. Rather than the loose organization that characterized the two parties until then, the Leninist party operated on the principle of democratic centralism, in which the collective leadership set standards for membership and an all powerful Central Committee determined the Party line, which all members must follow.

The CCP grew rapidly in the Northern Expedition (1925–1927), a military unification campaign led by Sun Yat-sen's successor, Chiang Kai-shek. The Party, still led by urban intellectuals, developed a radical agenda of mass mobilization, labor organization, rural uprisings, anti-imperialism, and national unification. As the Northern Expedition neared success, Chiang in December 1927 unleashed a White Terror that virtually wiped out the CCP in the cities. Mao Zedong, whose Autumn Harvest Uprising had been a spectacular failure in mobilizing local peasants, nevertheless became Party leader and established rural bases and creation of the Chinese Red Army to protect them. During the Second Sino-Japanese War (1937–1945) Mao led a rectification campaign to emphasize Maoism and his leadership and after the war he led the CCP to victory in the Chinese Civil War (1945–1949).

In the years after 1949, the structure of the CCP remained basically the same, but the style of leadership changed several times.

History during the Revolution

Establishment of the CCP 

Marxist ideas started to spread widely in China after the 1919 May Fourth Movement. In June 1920, Comintern agent Grigori Voitinsky was one of several sent to China, where he met Li Dazhao and other reformers. While in China, Voitinsky financed the founding of the Socialist Youth Corps.  One of the agents worked with Chen Duxiu to draft a manifesto. In June 1921, Henk Sneevliet, an overbearing Dutch agent from the Communist International arrived in Shanghai, and arranged a meeting in a deserted girls' school in the French Concession to which thirteen of the fifty-seven declared Communists were invited There, they proclaimed the establishment of the Chinese Communist Party."

In the summer of 1919, the Russian Communist Party (Bolsheviks) decided to assist people of the Far East. In April 1920, the Foreign Affairs Division of its Vladivostok Branch sent Grigori Voitinsky to develop Marxism in China, Korea and Japan. Voitinsky met Li, and then successfully turned Chen into a communist. Voitinsky found the Far Eastern Secretariat of the Communist International (Comintern) at Shanghai. On 5 July, he attended a meeting of Russian communists in China to promote the establishment of the CCP. He helped Chen found the Shanghai Revolutionary Bureau, also known as the Shanghai Communist Group. Stojanovic went to Guangzhou, Mamaev went to Wuhan, and Broway went to Beijing to help Chinese establish communist groups. Voitinsky provided these groups with promotional, conference and study abroad expenses.

The preliminary organization and recruitment for a Chinese Communist Party were done by Grigori Voitinsky, who led the foundation, Chen Duxiu and Li Dazhao in 1920 and 1921 as a study society and an informal network. Informal meetings were held in China in 1920 as well as overseas.

The official beginning of the CCP was the 1st Congress held in Shanghai and Jiaxing in July 1921. Some say the congress was composed of 13 men, but the official CCP version is 12, and other sources also disagree.

The birth of the CCP (totaling 50 to 60 members) was declared while a meeting was held on a boat on South Lake. The General Assembly adopted The First Program of the Communist Party of China, stating that "the Party is to be named the Communist Party of China" and specifying its objectives: "to overthrow the power of the capitalist class[,]" to "eradicate capitalism and private ownership of property[,]" and to "join the Comintern." The key delegates in the congress were Li Dazhao, Chen Duxiu, Chen Gongbo, Tan Pingshan, Zhang Guotao, He Mengxiong, Lou Zhanglong and Deng Zhongxia.

Mao Zedong was present at the first congress as one of two delegates from a Hunan communist group.  Other attendees included Dong Biwu, Li Hanjun, Li Da, Chen Tanqiu, Liu Renjing, Zhou Fohai, He Shuheng, Deng . Two representatives from the Comintern were also present, one of them being Henk Sneevliet (also known by the single name 'Maring'). Notably absent at this early point were future leaders Li Lisan and Qu Qiubai.

First Civil Revolution Period—the First United Front (1922–1927)
In August 1922, Sneevliet called a surprise special plenum of the central committee. During the meeting Sneevliet proposed that party members join the Kuomintang (KMT, or Chinese Nationalist Party) on the grounds that it was easier to transform the Nationalist Party from the inside than to duplicate its success. Li Dazhao, Cai Heshen and Gao Yuhan opposed the motion, whereupon Sneevliet invoked the authority of the Comintern and forced the CCP to accept his decision. Under the guidance of the Comintern, the CCP was reorganized along Leninist lines in 1923, in preparation for the Northern Expedition. The nascent party was not held in high regard. Karl Radek, one of the five founding leaders of the Comintern, said in November 1922 that the CCP was not highly regarded in Moscow. Moreover, the CCP was divided into two camps, one led by Deng Zhongxia and Li Dazhao on the more moderate "bourgeois, national revolution" model and the other by Zhang Guotao, Lou Zhanglong, He Mengxiong and Chen Duxiu on the strongly anti-imperialism side. Mikhail Markovich Borodin negotiated with Sun Yat-sen and Wang Jingwei the 1923 KMT reorganization and the CCP's incorporation into the newly expanded party. Borodin and General Vasilii Blyukher (known as Galen) worked with Chiang Kai-shek to found the Whampoa Military Academy. The CCP's reliance on the leadership of the Comintern provided a strong indication of the First United Front's fragility.  The death of Sun Yat-sen in 1925 created great uncertainty regarding who would lead the party, and whether they would still work with the Communists. Despite the tensions, the Northern Expedition (1926–1927) led by the Kuomintang, with participation of the CCP made quick gains in overthrowing the warlord government. The CCP still treats Sun Yat-sen as  one of the founders of their movement and claim descent from him as he is viewed as a proto communist and the economic element of Sun's ideology was socialism. Sun stated, “Our Principle of Livelihood is a form of communism”. His widow, Soong Qingling, actually became Honorary President of the PRC.

Second Civil Revolution Period and the Soviet Republic of China (1927–1937)
In 1927, as the Northern Expedition approached Shanghai, the Kuomintang leadership split.  The left-wing of the Kuomintang, based in Wuhan, kept the alliance with the Communists, while Chiang Kai-shek in Nanjing grew increasingly hostile to them and launched a campaign against them. This happened after the capture of Shanghai, which occurred with the Communists and Kuomintang still in alliance.  André Malraux's novel, Man's Fate (French: La Condition Humaine), is based on these events.

The anti-communist drive became general.  As Chiang Kai-shek consolidated his power, various revolts continued, and Communist armed forces created a number of 'Soviet Areas'. The largest of these was led by Zhu De and Mao Zedong, who established Soviet Republic of China in some remote areas within China through peasant riots.  A number of KMT military campaigns failed, but in the meantime CCP leadership were driven out of Shanghai and moved to Mao's base, sidelining him.

Chiang Kai-shek launched a further campaign which succeeded.  The CCP had to give up their bases and started the Long March (1934–1935) to search for a new base. During the Long March, the party leadership re-examined its policy and blamed their failure on the CCP military leader Otto Braun, a German sent by Comintern. During the Long March, the native Communists, such as Mao Zedong and Zhu De gained power. The Comintern and Soviet Union lost control over the CCP. They settled in Shaanxi, where there was an existing Communist base.

The Western world first got a clear view of the main base of the Chinese Communist Party through Edgar Snow's Red Star Over China.  Snow was also the first person to present Mao as the main leader – he was previously seen as just a guerilla leader and mostly as second to Zhu De (Chu Teh).

In this period, young people dominated the Party from its lowest to highest levels. According to Snow, the average age of Red Army rank-and-file soldiers was nineteen as of 1936. The Party's highest-ranking leaders had been students during the May Fourth period and were thus in their mid-thirties or forties after more than a decade of leadership.

Sino-Japanese War Period—Second United Front (1937–1945)

During the Second Sino-Japanese war (1937–1945), the CCP and KMT were temporarily in alliance to fight their common enemy. The Communist government moved from Bao'an (Pao An) to Yan'an (Yenan) in December 1936. The Chinese Workers' and Peasants' Red Army became army groups belonging to the national army (8th route army and New 4th Army), and the Soviet Republic of China changed its name as a special Shaan-Gan-Ning administration region (named after the Shaanxi-Gansu-Ningxia provinces at the borders of each it was located). However, essentially the army and the region controlled by CCP remained independent from the KMT's government.

In eight years, the CCP membership increased from 40,000 to 1,200,000 and its military forces – from 30,000 to approximately one million in addition to more than one million militia support groups.

It is a well accepted idea that without the Japanese invasion, the CCP might not have developed so fast. This accelerated development is attributed by some to the lack of attention the CCP paid to the war against Japan, they argue that the Chinese Communists took advantage of the KMT's preoccupation with the Japanese to gain an edge on the nationalists. This, however, was not entirely true as the Chinese Communists did wage costly Hundred Regiments Offensive and guerrilla wars against Japanese occupied areas. However, some scholars, such as Japanese professor Homare Endo, claim that Mao Zedong colluded with the invading Japanese forces to assist them in effectively attacking KMT forces.

Third Civil Revolution Period (1946–1949) 
After the conclusion of World War II, the civil war resumed between the Kuomintang and the CCP. Although the CCP participated in the National Constituent Assembly, due to the attacks by the Nationalist government, the party was officially banned by the government in June 1946, with party leaders including Mao Zedong wanted.

Despite initial gains by the KMT, they were eventually defeated and forced to flee to off-shore islands, most notably Taiwan. In the war, the United States supported the Kuomintang and the Soviet Union supported the CCP, but both to limited extent. With the Kuomintang's defeat & retreat to Taiwan, Mao Zedong established the People's Republic of China in Beijing on 1 October 1949.

As the ruling party 
On 1 October 1949, Chairman Mao Zedong formally proclaimed the establishment of the PRC before a massive crowd at Tiananmen Square. The CCP headed the Central People's Government. From this time through the 1980s, top leaders of the CCP (like Mao Zedong, Lin Biao, Zhou Enlai and Deng Xiaoping) were largely the same military leaders prior to the PRC's founding. As a result, informal personal ties between political and military leaders dominated civil-military relations.

Soviet leader Joseph Stalin proposed a one-party constitution when Liu Shaoqi visited the Soviet Union in 1952. Then the Constitution of the PRC in 1954 changed the previous coalition government and established the CCP's sole ruling system. Mao said that China should implement a multi-party system under the leadership of the working class revolutionary party (CCP) on the CCP's 8th Congress in 1956. He had not proposed that other parties should be led before, although the CCP had actually controlled the most political power since 1949.

During the 1960s and 1970s, the CCP experienced a significant ideological separation from the Communist Party of the Soviet Union. By that time, Mao had begun saying that the "continued revolution under the dictatorship of the proletariat" stipulated that class enemies continued to exist even though the socialist revolution seemed to be complete, leading to the Cultural Revolution in which millions were persecuted and killed.

Following Mao's death in 1976, a power struggle between CCP chairman Hua Guofeng and Vice-chairman Deng Xiaoping erupted. Deng won the struggle, and became the "paramount leader" in 1978. Deng, alongside Hu Yaobang and Zhao Ziyang, spearheaded the Reform and opening policy, and introduced the ideological concept of socialism with Chinese characteristics, opening China to the world's markets. In reversing some of Mao's "leftist" policies, Deng argued that a socialist state could use the market economy without itself being capitalist. While asserting the political power of the CCP, the change in policy generated significant economic growth. The new ideology, however, was contested on both sides of the spectrum, by Maoists as well as by those supporting political liberalization. With other social factors, the conflicts culminated in the 1989 Tiananmen Square protests and massacre. The protests having been crushed, Deng's vision on economics prevailed, and by the early 1990s the concept of a socialist market economy had been introduced. In 1997, Deng's beliefs (Deng Xiaoping Theory), were embedded in the CCP constitution.

CCP general secretary Jiang Zemin succeeded Deng as "paramount leader" in the 1990s, and continued most of his policies. In the 1990s, the CCP transformed from a veteran revolutionary leadership that was both leading militarily and politically, to a political elite increasingly regenerated according to institutionalized norms in the civil bureaucracy. Leadership was largely selected based on rules and norms on promotion and retirement, educational background, and managerial and technical expertise. There is a largely separate group of professionalized military officers, serving under top CCP leadership largely through formal relationships within institutional channels.

As part of Jiang Zemin's nominal legacy, the CCP ratified the Three Represents for the 2003 revision of the party's constitution, as a "guiding ideology" to encourage the party to represent "advanced productive forces, the progressive course of China's culture, and the fundamental interests of the people." The theory legitimized the entry of private business owners and bourgeois elements into the CCP. Hu Jintao, Jiang Zemin's successor as general secretary, took office in 2002. Unlike Mao, Deng and Jiang Zemin, Hu laid emphasis on collective leadership and opposed one-man dominance of the political system. The insistence on focusing on economic growth led to a wide range of serious social problems. To address these, Hu introduced two main ideological concepts: the Scientific Outlook on Development and Harmonious Socialist Society. Hu resigned from his post as CCP general secretary and Chairman of the CMC at the 18th National Congress held in 2012, and was succeeded in both posts by Xi Jinping.
Since taking power, Xi has initiated a wide-reaching anti-corruption campaign, while centralizing powers in the office of CCP general secretary at the expense of the collective leadership of prior decades. Commentators have described the campaign as a defining part of Xi's leadership as well as "the principal reason why he has been able to consolidate his power so quickly and effectively." Foreign commentators have likened him to Mao. Xi's leadership has also overseen an increase in the CCP's role in China. Xi has added his ideology, named after himself, into the CCP constitution in 2017. As has been speculated, Xi Jinping may not retire from his top posts after serving for 10 years in 2022.

In June 2020, Cai Xia, a retired professor of CCP's Central Party School, voiced criticisms against Xi Jinping, the General Secretary of the CCP, in which she compared Xi to a "mafia boss" and the ruling Communist Party a "political zombie". In a 20-minute audio on social networking sites, she said that everyone is Xi's slave, and that there is no human rights or rule of law. She suggested that Xi should retire. On 17 August 2020, Cai Xia was expelled from the CCP's Central Party School and her  retirement pensions were cancelled.

On 24 July 2020 the CCP expelled an outspoken and influential property tycoon, Ren Zhiqiang, who denounced CCP general secretary Xi. He went missing in March after criticizing Xi, and later his case was passed to the judiciary system for criminal investigation.

On 1 October 2020, U.S. Congressman Scott Perry introduced legislation to add the CCP to the Top International Criminal Organizations Target (TICOT) List and provide the United States law enforcement agencies a strategic directive to target the CCP's activity.

On 21 October 2020, the Subcommittee on International Human Rights (SDIR) of the Canadian House of Commons Standing Committee on Foreign Affairs and International Development condemned the persecution of Uyghurs and other Turkic Muslims in Xinjiang by the Government of China and concluded that the Chinese Communist Party's actions amount to genocide of the Uyghurs per the Genocide Convention.

On 1 July 2021, the celebrations of the 100th anniversary of the CCP, one of the Two Centenaries, took place.

See also 

 History of the Republic of China
 History of the People's Republic of China
 History of the Communist Party of Vietnam
 History of the Communist Party of the Soviet Union

References